Ellen Moers (1928–1979) was an American academic and literary scholar. She is best known for her pioneering contribution to gynocriticism, Literary Women (1976).

Feminist breakthrough
After two exact but conventional books (on the dandy and on Theodore Dreiser), Moers was caught up by Second-wave feminism, which she credits with "pulling me out of the stacks" and leading her to write Literary Women.  In the latter she established the existence of a strong nineteenth-century tradition of (international) women writers—her identification within it of what she called 'female Gothic' proving especially influential.

In the fast-moving world of feminist scholarship, her book would be challenged in the following decade as under-theorised and ethnocentric; but continued nonetheless to serve as a significant stepping-stone for future scholarship.

Twin traditions
Moers pointed to the ambiguous origins of the dandy, in a merger of French and English traditions; to the paradox in the dandy's highly structured pose of inaction; and to the role of the female dandy.

She indicated Dreiser's twin role on the cusp between 19th-century realism and 20th-century realism, as well as his roots in the different religious traditions of Catholicism and Protestantism.

See also
Beau Brummell
Anna Louise Germaine de Stael
Sandra Gilbert

References

External links 
 Finding aid to Ellen Moers papers records at Columbia University. Rare Book & Manuscript Library.

1928 births
1979 deaths
American literary critics
Women literary critics
Feminist theory
Second-wave feminism
American women critics